Tuhat Laulujen Vuotta is a 1957 poetry collection by Finnish poet and translator Aale Tynni.

It is a Finnish translation; a comprehensive anthology of a large scope of European poetry ranging from the Middle Ages.

1957 poetry books
Medieval poetry
Finnish poetry books
Poetry anthologies
Translations into Finnish